Ľudovít Kaník (born 1 September 1965 in Hnúšťa) is a Slovak politician and member of the Democratic Party of Slovakia. He also led Slovak Civic Democratic Party.

Kaník was formerly the Minister of Labour, Social Affairs, and Family.

References

External links 
  

1965 births
Living people
People from Hnúšťa
Democratic Party (Slovakia, 1989) politicians
Civic Democratic Party (Czech Republic) politicians
University of Economics in Bratislava alumni
Members of the National Council (Slovakia) 2010-2012
Members of the National Council (Slovakia) 2012-2016
Labour ministers of Slovakia